David Harris Leake (July 13, 1875 – May 8, 1955) was an American lawyer and politician who served in the Virginia House of Delegates, representing Fluvanna and Goochland counties, and as general attorney of the Chesapeake and Ohio Railway.

References

External links 

1875 births
1955 deaths
Democratic Party members of the Virginia House of Delegates
20th-century American politicians